SDZ may refer to:

San Diego Zoo
Serbian Railways, reporting mark SDŽ
Shankar Dada Zindabad, an Indian film
Split-Dalmatia County (Croatian: Splitsko-dalmatinska županija), a county in Croatia
Süddeutsche Zeitung, a German newspaper published in Munich, Bavaria